The Danis–Weber classification (often known just as the Weber classification) is a method of describing ankle fractures. It has three categories:

Type A
Fracture of the fibula distal to the syndesmosis (the connection between the distal ends of the tibia and fibula). Typical features:
 below level of the ankle joint
 tibiofibular syndesmosis intact
 deltoid ligament intact
 medial malleolus occasionally fractured
 usually stable: occasionally nonetheless requires an open reduction and internal fixation (ORIF) particularly if medial malleolus fractured

Type B
Fracture of the fibula at the level of the syndesmosis. Typical features:
 at the level of the ankle joint, extending superiorly and laterally up the fibula
 tibiofibular syndesmosis intact or only partially torn, but no widening of the distal tibiofibular articulation
 medial malleolus may be fractured or deltoid ligament may be torn
 variable stability

Type C
Fracture of the fibula proximal to the syndesmosis. Typical features:
 above the level of the ankle joint
 tibiofibular syndesmosis disrupted with widening of the distal tibiofibular articulation
 medial malleolus fracture or deltoid ligament injury present
 unstable: requires ORIF

Categories B and C imply a degree of damage to the syndesmosis itself (which cannot be directly visualised on X-ray). They are inherently unstable and are more likely to require operative repair to achieve a good outcome. Type A fractures are usually stable and can be managed with simple measures, such as a plaster of paris cast.

See also
 Lauge-Hansen classification

References

Bone fractures
Ankle fracture classifications
Injuries of ankle and foot